I Am Dale Earnhardt is a 2015 documentary TV film created by NASCAR Productions and Spike TV, that takes an in-depth look into the life and death of Dale Earnhardt. It is part of a series of I AM documentaries that air on Spike TV.

Content

The film features interviews from several NASCAR drivers or former drivers including Earnhardt's son Dale Earnhardt Jr., as well as Jeff Gordon, Jimmie Johnson, Darrell Waltrip, Rusty Wallace and more. It also features classic footage from Earnhardt Sr.'s career.

References

External links

American auto racing films
American sports documentary films
Documentary films about auto racing
Documentary films about sportspeople
NASCAR on television
Spike (TV network) original programming
Dale Earnhardt
2015 films
2010s American films